Mohammed Helal (Arabic:محمد هلال) (born 10 August 1995) is an Emirati footballer who plays as a midfielder for Ajman.

Career

Ajman
Mohammed Helal started his career at Ajman and is a product of the Ajman's youth system. On 20 December 2014, Mohammed Helal made his professional debut for Ajman against Al-Fujairah in the Pro League, replacing Nasser Abdulhadi.

Al Ain
On 13 June 2019 left Ajmanl and signed with Al Ain. On 14 February 2020, Mohammed Helal made his professional debut for Al Ain against Ittihad Kalba in the Pro League, replacing Bauyrzhan Islamkhan.

References

External links
 

1995 births
Living people
Emirati footballers
Ajman Club players
Al Ain FC players
UAE Pro League players
UAE First Division League players
Association football midfielders
Place of birth missing (living people)